The Sori-Harengan language is a West Manus language spoken by approximately 570 people on the Sori and Harengan Islands, northwest off the coast of Manus Island, and on the northwestern coast Manus Island, Papua New Guinea. It has SVO word order.

References

External links 
 Notes on Sori by Robert Blust are archived with Kaipuleohone

Manus languages
Languages of Manus Province
Subject–verb–object languages